Rosamond Lake is a natural dry lake bed in the Mojave Desert of Kern- and Los Angeles County, California. The lake is adjacent to Rogers Dry Lake which through the Holocene, together made up one large water-body. Piute Ponds are immediately to the southwest.

See also
 List of lakes in California

References

External links
 Edwards Air Force Base official website

Endorheic lakes of California
Lakes of the Mojave Desert
Salt flats of California
Lakes of Kern County, California
Lakes of Los Angeles County, California
Edwards Air Force Base
Rosamond, California
Lakes of California
Lakes of Southern California